John Wilson (1807 – January 10, 1876) was an immigrant from Ireland to the United States who held positions in the United States Department of the Treasury and United States Department of the Interior.

Biography
John Wilson was born in Ireland and settled in the District of Columbia at an early age. He held a clerkship in the United States Post Office and United States Department of the Treasury. He was appointed Commissioner of the General Land Office in 1852, and held that office until 1855. He later practiced law in Chicago before returning to Washington to serve as Third Auditor of the Treasury, a post he held from 1864 to 1869.

Wilson remained in Washington to work as a claim agent and attorney. He died in Washington on January 10, 1876 at age 68, and was buried at Rock Creek Cemetery in Washington.

Wilson's brother, Joseph S. Wilson, also served as Commissioner of the General Land Office.

Wilson was the nephew of Congressman James Shields (1762-1831), and the cousin of Senator James Shields (1806-1879).

References

1807 births
1876 deaths
General Land Office Commissioners
Lawyers from Washington, D.C.
Irish emigrants to the United States (before 1923)
Burials at Rock Creek Cemetery
19th-century American lawyers